Shartiya Mithay (شرطیہ مٹھے) (English: Guaranteed Sweet) is a famous and hit Punjabi comedy stage play. Cast includes Amanullah, Sohail Ahmed, Babu Baral, Zarqa Butt, Khalid Abbas Dar, Ashraf Rahi, Sohnia Abbas, Abid Khan and Sahbah.

Characters 
 Roshan
One of the two blind brothers. He and his brother want to get married but always get rejected because of their blindness.
 Chiraag
The other blind brother.
 Dada Ji
The Flirting grandfather of Chiraag and Roshan. He runs a Tuck shop and talks to a picture of "Sonali Bendre", wants to get married for the fourth time.
 Abba Ji
Strict father of blind brothers, he wants to turn his sons into beggars.
 Shirin
A student of journalism who is writing a column on Beggars, a young girl who also wants to interview Roshan.

Cast
 Amanullah as Roshan
 Sohail Ahmed as Dada Ji
 Babu Baral as Chiraag
 Zarqa Butt as Bhaabi
 Khalid Abbas Dar
 Ashraf Rahi
 Sohnia Abbas
 Abid Khan as Abba Ji
 Sahbah as Shirin

References

Comedy plays
Punjabi-language mass media
Pakistani plays